Chrodebert I (Chrotbert, Radobertus, Robert I) (died 695), Merovingian referendary and Bishop of Tours (as Chrotbert, 660-695), son of Charibert de Haspengau and his wife Wulfgurd.  Robert and his brothers Erlebert and Aldebert were the ancestors of the Robertians.

Robert began his career as a referendary to Dagobert I, the last powerful king of the Merovingian dynasty, and his son Clovis II. He was the Mayor of the Palace of Burgundy (as Radobertus) from 642-662) and possibly that of Neustria during the interregnum of Ebroin.  He may have been Bishop of Paris, but there is little evidence to support this.

Robert was married to Glismoda of Bavaria, parentage unknown.  They had two children:
 Lambert I of Hesbaye
 Saint Angadrisma, married to Ansbert of Rouen

Lambert was the father of count palatine Chrodbert.

References

Sources 
Settipani, Christian, Les Ancêtres de Charlemagne, 2e édition revue et corrigée, éd. P & G, Prosopographia et Genealogica, 2015,
Settipani, Christian. Addenda aux "Ancêtres de Charlemagne, 1990
Medieval Lands Project, Chrodebert I

695 deaths
7th-century Frankish nobility
7th-century Frankish bishops
Bishops of Tours
Year of birth unknown